The Galya is a small river in Nógrád County, northern Hungary. It originates in Mátra, 830 metres above sea level, southeast of Mátraalmás. It flows north up to Nemti, where it then flows into  the Zagyva.

Settlements on the banks 
 Mátraalmás
 Szuha
 Mátramindszent
 Nemti

Rivers of Hungary